Benjamin Tarr (born 17 March 1994), is an American rugby union player who plays for the New Orleans Gold in Major League Rugby (MLR). His usual position is tighthead prop. He also played for the United States national team.

Early life 
Tarr grew up in Indianapolis, Indiana, before studying and playing rugby at the Southport School in Queensland, Australia.

Career 
Tarr represented the United States under-20 team at the 2014 Junior World Rugby Trophy where he played in the front row alongside fellow future USA Eagle Titi Lamositele. He then joined the USA Selects for the 2014 Americas Rugby Championship.

Tarr was selected for the USA Eagles 2014 Autumn tour to Europe. He made his test match debut on November 8 against Romania when he replaced Olive Kilifi at tight-head prop. A week later he won his second cap, again as a replacement, this time replacing Mate Moeakiola.

In February 2016, Tarr signed up to the new PRO Rugby North American competition with the Denver Stampede. In early 2018 he joined the New Orleans Gold of Major League Rugby. In 2019 he also provided commentary and was a ground announcer for regular season fixtures.

References

External links 
 http://en.espn.co.uk/scrum/rugby/player/247199.html
 http://www.usarugby.org/player/ben-tarr/

Rugby union players from Indiana
1994 births
Living people
Denver Stampede players
New Orleans Gold players
Sportspeople from Indianapolis
United States international rugby union players
Rugby union props
American rugby union players